Nathaniel Bright Emerson (July 1, 1839 Waialua, Oahu – July 16, 1915, at sea) was a medical physician and author of Hawaiian mythology. He was the son of Protestant missionaries John S. Emerson and Ursula Newell Emerson, and father of artist Arthur Webster Emerson.

He attended Williams College in Williamstown, Massachusetts. He joined the 1st Regiment Massachusetts Volunteer Infantry of the Union Army as a private on September 22, 1862 in Boston during the Civil War. He was wounded three times. After graduating from Williams in 1865, he studied at Harvard and the Columbia University College of Physicians and Surgeons in New York City, from which he graduated in 1869. This was followed by work at Bellevue Hospital in New York City. In New York, Emerson was associated with Willard Parker, a surgeon, as student and assistant. For several years he was also clinical assistant to Dr. Seguin, professor of nervous diseases at the College of Physicians and Surgeons. He served as a doctor in New York until 1878, after which he relocated to Hawaii.

Emerson was an historian and writer of Hawaiian mythology. One of his efforts was the translation into English of David Malo's work on Hawaiian lore and customs. In 1909, the Bureau of American Ethnology published his book, Unwritten Literature of Hawaii, and his last work, Pele and Hiiaka, was published in 1915.

Emerson has been criticized by Hawaiian royalists and historians for being a founding member of the Hawaiian League of 1887, which authored the Bayonet Constitution forced on King Kalākaua, under threat of death. An original copy of the 1887 constitution in the Hawaii State Archives, once owned by William Owen Smith, contains a side note written by Smith listing Emerson as one of the main contributors to the constitution alongside Smith, Sanford B. Dole and Lorrin A. Thurston. He was also criticized for testifying in Washington, D.C. in support of the annexation of Hawaii.

See also
Hale Nauā Society

References

Mamiya Heratige Medical Center website
Emerson, Nathaniel Bright.  Unwritten Literature of Hawaii: the Sacred Songs of the Hula.  Smithsonian Institution, Bureau of American Ethnology, 1909.
Hawaiian Antiquities (Moolelo Hawaii), as translated by Emerson, 1987 edition, Bishop Museum Press, 
Pele and Hiiaka: A Myth from Hawaii, by Nathaniel B. Emerson, A.M., M.D., paperback revised edition, Edith Kanaka'ole Foundation, 2005,

External links

1839 births
1915 deaths
Punahou School alumni
Williams College alumni
Harvard University alumni
Columbia University Vagelos College of Physicians and Surgeons alumni
Writers from Hawaii
People of Massachusetts in the American Civil War
People of the Hawaiian Kingdom in the American Civil War
Burials at Oahu Cemetery
Members of the Hawaii Board of Health
Union Army soldiers